Pachyrhabda dicastis is a moth of the family Stathmopodidae first described by Edward Meyrick in 1905. It is found in Sri Lanka.

References

Stathmopodidae
Moths described in 1905
Moths of Asia
Taxa named by Edward Meyrick